Petros Christodoulou (born 1960) is a Greek economist and banker.

Biography
Christodoulou was born in 1960.  Christodoulou earned his B.Sc. in finance at the Athens University of Economics and Business in 1982, and his MBA from Columbia University in 1985, with a specialization in Finance and Global Markets. After his graduation he worked for Credit Suisse First Boston (CFSB) in London. In 1987 Christodulou joined Goldman Sachs, working as Head of Money Markets Trading in Goldman Sachs London (1987–1988), and Head of Provincial Bond Trading at Goldman Sachs in Canada. In 1989 Christodoulou joined J.P. Morgan in London, working as Head of European Derivatives Trading (1989–1994), and Head of European Proprietary Trading (1994–1995). In 1995 he was promoted to Managing Director, responsible for European Short Term Interest Trading (1995–1997), and emerging markets in Europe and Africa (1997–1998).

From 1998 to 2010, Christodoulou worked for the National Bank of Greece (NBG), initially as the Group Treasurer and later as General Manager of Treasury, Global Markets and Private Banking of NBG. While working for the NBG, Christodoulou worked closely with his former employer Goldman Sachs and Chairman of the Bank of Greece Lucas Papademos in organizing controversial financial operations which enabled Greece to join the Euro. On 25 February 2010, Prime Minister of Greece George Papandreou appointed Christodoulou General Manager of the Public Debt Management Agency (PDMA). Upon his appointment to the post, the German magazine Der Spiegel referred to Christodoulou as "Greece's Saviour." While General Manager of the PDMA, Christodoulou led the negotiations to restructure the Greek government debt, which resulted in a €106,5 bn debt reduction.

Upon his departure from the PDMA in June 2012, Christodoulou was on 11 June 2012 appointed General Manager of International Activities of the NBG.  On 28 June 2012 he was in addition elected an Executive Member of the Board of Directors and Deputy Chief Executive Officer of the NBG. Christodoulou is also Chairman of the NBG's Asset and Liability and the Disclosure and Transparency Committees and a Member of the NBG's Integration Steering Committee and the Risk Management, Strategy, Executive and Provision and Write Off Committees. He serves as a Member of the Investment Committee of Ethniki Hellenic General Insurance, the Foundation for Economic and Industrial Research and the board of AEK Athens F.C.

See also
 Carlos Moedas
 Massimo Tononi

References

1960 births
Living people
20th-century Greek economists
Greek bankers
Columbia Business School alumni
Credit Suisse First Boston
Goldman Sachs people
JPMorgan Chase people
Greek government-debt crisis
21st-century Greek economists